Andrew Rodgers (born 18 October 1983 in Falkirk) is a Scottish footballer and coach who plays as a forward for Syngenta.

Career

Rodgers began his career at Falkirk, scoring nine minutes into his debut after coming on as a substitute in a 2–1 win against Ross County in the First Division on 24 November 2001. During his time at Falkirk he spent a week on trial at English club Tottenham Hotspur in 2001.

On 20 December 2003, he left Falkirk to join Dumbarton, initially on loan, before signing permanently on 18 June 2004.

After two seasons at Dumbarton, on 22 July 2006, Rodgers moved to Montrose. He then signed for East Stirlingshire on 1 February 2008.

On 11 July 2010, Rodgers signed for Second Division club Ayr United.

Rodgers was released by Ayr in 2011 and signed for Stenhousemuir. He was awarded the SFL Goal of the Month for September 2011 for his overhead kick against East Fife, he had also scored a similar effort for Ayr United in a Scottish Cup tie against Junior club Sunnybank the previous season.

On 25 January 2013, Rodgers signed for Peterhead on loan until the end of the 2012–13 season. On 21 June 2013, he agreed a deal to sign permanently for Peterhead. On 12 April 2014, Rodgers opened the scoring in Peterhead's 2–0 win against Clyde, a result which meant the club won the Scottish League Two title and promotion to League One.

In July 2016, Rodgers returned to East Stirlingshire on a month-long loan deal. On 8 September 2016, Rodgers signed a full contract with East Stirlingshire until the end of the season. Rodgers scored 41 goals in his first season back at East Stirlingshire before following this up with 18 goals in the 2017-18 campaign, then 6 goals in 2018-19 and 3 goals in 2019–20. Rodgers was appointed player/assistant manager of The Shire in September 2018, alongside teammate and Shire legend Derek Ure; who took over managerial duties as player/manager.

Rodgers left East Stirlingshire on 4 January 2021, and later signed with Shire's Lowland League rivals Kelty Hearts on 6 January 2021.

Syngenta announced the signing of Rodgers on 4 June 2021.

Honours
Falkirk
Scottish First Division: 2002–03

Peterhead
Scottish League Two: 2013–14

References

External links

 Dumbarton loan stats

1983 births
Scottish footballers
Falkirk F.C. players
Dumbarton F.C. players
Montrose F.C. players
East Stirlingshire F.C. players
Ayr United F.C. players
Stenhousemuir F.C. players
Peterhead F.C. players
Scottish Football League players
Scottish Professional Football League players
Living people
Association football forwards
Kelty Hearts F.C. players